1997 crash can refer to:
 1997 M42 motorway crash
 FedEx Express Flight 14
 October 27, 1997, mini-crash

See also 
 :Category:Transport disasters in 1997
 1997 Asian financial crisis